Muskrat Brook flows into Little Black Creek west of Wheelertown, New York.

References 

Rivers of Oneida County, New York
Rivers of New York (state)
Rivers of Herkimer County, New York